Western Technical College (Western) is a public technical college in La Crosse, Wisconsin. A member of the Wisconsin Technical College System, the Western Technical College District serves 11 counties and enrolls over 5,000 students. The college has six campus locations in western Wisconsin, and its main campus is in downtown La Crosse. Western is accredited by the Higher Learning Commission.

History
Founded in 1912, the school was previously known as Western Wisconsin Technical College (WWTC), but "Wisconsin" was dropped on March 29, 2006. Western received voter approval for facilities improvement via referendums in 1992 ($8.9 million), 1996 ($3.65 million), and 2012 ($79.8 million).

Former names
 1912-17: La Crosse Continuation and Adult Schools
 1917-63: La Crosse Vocational School
 1963-65: Coleman Vocational and Adult Schools
 1965-68: Coleman Technical Institute 
 1968-87: Western Wisconsin Technical Institute 
 1987-2006: Western Wisconsin Technical College 
 2006–present: Western Technical College

Locations

Other locations where classes are offered include:
 Black River Falls
 Independence
 Mauston
 Sparta
 Tomah
 Viroqua

Academics
Western Technical College offers more than 100 programs, providing associate degrees, technical diplomas, and certificates. The college also offers English Language Learners courses, GED/HSED classes, and apprenticeship training.

Western has agreements with several colleges and universities that allow students earn credits towards a bachelor's degree through their programs.

Athletics
Western Technical College's sports teams are called the Cavaliers, who play in red and white colors. The school began athletics in 1967. In 2020, the Western Cavaliers Women's Basketball team finished the season 25-6 and won the NJCAA Division III National Championship, the first national title in school history.

See also
 University of Wisconsin–La Crosse
 Viterbo University

References

External links
Official website
The History of Western Technical College, Bert Hoch

Wisconsin technical colleges
Buildings and structures in La Crosse, Wisconsin
Educational institutions established in 1912
Education in Juneau County, Wisconsin
Education in La Crosse County, Wisconsin
Education in Jackson County, Wisconsin
Education in Trempealeau County, Wisconsin
Education in Monroe County, Wisconsin
Education in Vernon County, Wisconsin
1912 establishments in Wisconsin
NJCAA athletics